Nagaram is a coastal village in the Konaseema district of Andhra Pradesh in South India. It is 13 km away from district headquarters  Amalapuram, 78 km from  Kakinada and 230 km from  Visakhapatnam. It falls on National Highway 216 which connects Ongole to Kathipudi in Andhra Pradesh.

Geography and climate

Muharram
Every year, Many Shia Muslims gather here from neighbouring towns and villages namely Amalapuram, Mummidivaram, Draksharamam and  Rajamahendravaram to take part in Muharram processions. The processions start in Nagaram immediately after viewing the moon which marks the beginning of Muharram Month. People mostly gather in Nagaram from 7th Muharram. People who follow Hindu religion also worship. Muharram holds a lot of prominence in Nagaram.

References

Villages in East Godavari district